ROCS Su Ao (蘇澳, DDG-1802) is a  guided-missile destroyer currently in active service of the Republic of China Navy. Su Ao was formerly American  , which was decommissioned from the United States Navy in 1998. For some time after the ship's 30 May 2003 purchase, Su Ao was tentatively named Ming Teh (明德), following the example of Chi Teh (紀德), but it was later decided to be named Su Ao, after the Su-Ao naval base in eastern Taiwan.

External links 

Kidd-class destroyers
Kee Lung-class destroyers
Ships built in Pascagoula, Mississippi
1979 ships
Destroyers of the Republic of China